Krasne Stare  is a village in the administrative district of Gmina Jasionówka, within Mońki County, Podlaskie Voivodeship, in north-eastern Poland.

The village has a population of 95.

References

Krasne Stare